Catherine Beck  may refer to:

Cathie Beck (born 1955), American author
K. K. Beck (born 1950), Katherine Beck, American novelist
Kathryn Beck (born 1986), Australian actress
Katie Beck (born 1982), American curler